Figari–Sud Corse Airport or Figari South Corsica Airport  is an airport located 3 km northwest of Figari, a commune of the Corse-du-Sud département in France, on the island of Corsica and 25 km southwest of Porto-Vecchio.

It is the third largest airport on Corsica and opened in 1975. In 2016 the airport served 639,916 passengers, representing an increase of 9.2% compared to 2015. Passenger traffic was made up of 100,209 passengers on international flights and 539,911 passengers on domestic flights.

Airlines and destinations
The following airlines operate regular scheduled and charter flights at Figari–Sud Corse Airport:

Statistics

See also
 Ajaccio – Napoléon Bonaparte Airport
 List of airports in France

References

External links 
Figari South Corsica Airport (official site) 
Aéroport Figari Sud-Corse (official site) 
Aéroport de Figari – Sud Corse at Union des Aéroports Français 

Airports in Corsica
Buildings and structures in Corse-du-Sud